Bob Nielson (born September 28, 1959) is an American football coach. He is the head football coach at the University of South Dakota, a position he had held since the 2016 season. Nielson was the head football coach at Ripon College (1989–1990), Wartburg College (1991–1995), the University of Wisconsin–Eau Claire (1996–1998), University of Minnesota–Duluth (1999–2003, 2008–2012), and Western Illinois University (2013–2015). His Minnesota–Duluth Bulldogs won the NCAA Division II Football Championship in 2008 and 2010.

Nielson grew up in Marion, Iowa, and is a 1982 graduate of Wartburg College in Waverly, Iowa. He received his master's degree from the University of Northern Iowa in 1988. He began his coaching career in 1981 as an assistant at Wartburg and was promoted to defensive coordinator in 1986.

Head coaching record

See also
 List of college football coaches with 200 wins

References

External links
 South Dakota profile

1959 births
Living people
Minnesota Duluth Bulldogs football coaches
Ripon Red Hawks football coaches
South Dakota Coyotes football coaches
Wartburg Knights football coaches
Wartburg Knights football players
Western Illinois Leathernecks football coaches
Wisconsin–Eau Claire Blugolds football coaches
Wartburg College alumni
University of Northern Iowa alumni
People from Marion, Iowa
Sportspeople from Cedar Rapids, Iowa